Sogatella furcifera is a species of planthopper in the family Delphacidae. It is a pest of sorghum in Asia and the Middle East.

References

Delphacinae
Insect pests of millets
Insects described in 1899